Elton Redalen (March 5, 1926 – July 10, 2009) was an American farmer and politician.

Born near Fountain, Minnesota, Redalen served in the United States Navy during World War II. He went to Miami University and University of Minnesota. Redalen was a dairy farmer. He served in the Minnesota House of Representatives as a Republican from 1977 until 1991. He then resigned and served as Commissioner of the Minnesota Department of Agriculture from 1991 until his retirement in 1995. Redalen died in Chatfield, Minnesota.

Notes

1926 births
2009 deaths
People from Fillmore County, Minnesota
Military personnel from Minnesota
Miami University alumni
University of Minnesota alumni
State cabinet secretaries of Minnesota
Republican Party members of the Minnesota House of Representatives
20th-century American politicians